Boldești-Grădiștea is a commune in Prahova County, Muntenia, Romania. It is composed of two villages, Boldești and Gradiștea; the former is the administrative centre.

References

Communes in Prahova County
Localities in Muntenia